The Miss Universe Canada 2003 pageant was held on March 1, 2003. The winner represented Canada in the Miss Universe 2003 and was a top 10 semi-finalist.

Final results

Special Awards

Official Delegates
Meet the 22 national delegates competing for the title of Miss Universe Canada 2003:

References

External links
Official Website

2003
2003 in Toronto
2003 beauty pageants